Asoka De Zoysa Gunawardana was a Sri Lankan judge of the International Criminal Tribunal for Rwanda (ICTR) from 1999 to 2004. He was also a judge of the Appeals Chamber of the International Criminal Tribunal for the former Yugoslavia (ICTY) and the International Criminal Tribunal for Rwanda (ICTR) from 2001 to 2004.

Previously Justice Gunawardana was a judge of the Court of Appeal of Sri Lanka from 1988 to 1996 and judge of the Supreme Court of Sri Lanka from 1996 to 1999.

Historical context
While the  Nuremberg and  Tokyo Tribunals were established by the occupying and victorious powers, the ICTY and the ICTR are the first truly international criminal courts. These two courts laid the foundation and legal precedents for the establishment of the permanent International Criminal Court (ICC).

Early life and education
Justice Gunawardana was born on 6 August 1942 in Balapitiya in Southern Sri Lanka. He attended the local primary school at Revatha College, Balapitiya, till grade 9. He then received a scholarship to attend S. Thomas' College, Mount Lavinia to study for his A-Level exam.

Justice Gunawardana graduated in law from the University of Ceylon, Colombo, in 1969 and obtained his Ph.D. in international law from the University of Sydney, Australia in 1986. He also holds a Diploma in Human Rights form Raoul Wallenberge Institute, University of Lund, Sweden (1993). Active in the field of international law and international human rights law, he has
participated in numerous international conferences and seminars, served as a panelist at the Meetings of the American Society of International Law and SAARCLAW conferences, and lectured in international law at Aristotle University in Thessaloniki, Greece.

Career
He was enrolled as an advocate of the Supreme Court of Sri Lanka in June 1967, and became Barrister-at-Law of the High Court of Australia and the Supreme Court of New South Wales in November 1984. He worked in Sri Lanka's Attorney-General's department as a Crown Counsel from 1972, and was appointed Deputy
Solicitor-General in 1986. In 1988 he was appointed a Judge of the Court of Appeal of Sri Lanka, and became President of the Court of Appeal in 1996. In December 1996, he was elevated to the Supreme Court, the highest Court in Sri Lanka.

Justice Gunawardana established international criminal law precedents through his ICTR work and ICTY work including:

Media Trial 
Held three media leaders accountable for inciting genocide while preserving important protections of international law on the right to freedom of expression, citing as an example, an interview of Barayagwiza broadcast on RTLM, which it described as “a moving personal account of his experience of discrimination as a Hutu”. The judgement held that it was “critical to distinguish between the discussion of ethnic consciousness and the promotion of ethnic hatred” and that the broadcast by Barayagwiza fell squarely within the scope of speech that is protected by the right to freedom of expression.

Bagilishema Trial 
Acquitted Ignace Bagilishema, the former Bourgmestre (mayor) of Mabanza Commune, because the prosecution failed to prove its case beyond reasonable doubt. This helped demonstrate the impartiality of the tribunal. In his separate opinion acquitting the accused, Justice Gunawardana considered Bagilishema’s plea that he lacked the means and resources to prevent the alleged commission of the atrocities in Mabanza Commune, and that he maintained law and order, to the best of his ability, with the resources that were available to him.

References

Puisne Justices of the Supreme Court of Sri Lanka
21st-century Sri Lankan people
Presidents of the Court of Appeal of Sri Lanka
Court of Appeal of Sri Lanka judges
Sinhalese judges
1942 births
2004 deaths